4,4′-Bipyridine (abbreviated to 4,4′-bipy or 4,4′-bpy) is an organic compound with the formula .  It is one of several isomers of bipyridine. It is a colorless solid that is soluble in organic solvents.   is mainly used as a precursor to N,N′-dimethyl-4,4′-bipyridinium [(C5H4NCH3)2]2+, known as paraquat.

History
4,4′-Bipyridine was first obtained in 1868 by the Scottish chemist Thomas Anderson via heating pyridine with sodium metal.  However, Anderson's empirical formula for 4,4′-bipyridine was incorrect.  The correct empirical formula, and the correct molecular structure, for 4,4′-bipyridine was provided in 1882 by the Austrian chemist Hugo Weidel and his student M. Russo.

Uses 
4,4'-Bipyridine is an intermediate in the production of paraquat, a widely-used herbicide. In this process, pyridine is oxidized to 4,4'-bipyridine in a coupling reaction, followed by dimethylation to form paraquat.

Reactions
The reducing agent is N,N'-bis(trimethylsilyl)-4,4'-bipyridinylidene is produced by reduction of 4,4'-bipyridine in the presence of trimethylsilyl chloride (Me = CH3):

The silylated derivative, which is red, is used in salt-free reductions.

4,4′-bipyridine forms a variety of coordination polymers.

References

Bipyridines